The Union of Ibero-American Capital Cities, UCCI ( and ), is an international, non-governmental organization of 29 major Ibero-American cities that fosters ties and friendly relations between its members.  Founded in October 1982, the union is headquartered in Madrid.

According to the UCCI's website, the current member cities are:
 Andorra la Vella (capital of Andorra)
 Asunción (capital of Paraguay)
 Barcelona (capital of the Spanish Region, Catalonia)
 Bogotá (capital of Colombia)
 Brasília (capital of Brazil)
 Buenos Aires (capital of Argentina)
 Caracas (capital of Venezuela - both Libertador Bolivarian Municipality and the Metropolitan District of Caracas are members)
 Cádiz 
 Guatemala City (capital of Guatemala)
 Havana (capital of Cuba)
 La Paz (Administrative capital of Bolivia)
 Lisbon (capital of Portugal)
 Lima (capital of Peru)
 Madrid (capital of Spain)
 Managua (capital of Nicaragua)
 Mexico City (capital of Mexico)
 Montevideo (capital of Uruguay)
 Panama City (capital of Panama)
 Port-au-Prince (capital of Haiti)
 Rio de Janeiro (capital of the Brazilian State of Rio de Janeiro - former capital of Brazil)
 Quito (capital of Ecuador)
 San José (capital of Costa Rica)
 San Juan (capital of the U.S. territory of Puerto Rico)
 San Salvador (capital of El Salvador)
 Santiago (capital of Chile)
 Santo Domingo (capital of the Dominican Republic)
 São Paulo (capital of the Brazilian State of São Paulo)
 Sucre (capital of Bolivia)
 Tegucigalpa (capital of Honduras)

References 
 Union of Ibero-American Capital Cities - UCCI

External links 
 

Intergovernmental organizations